Joshua James LeRibeus (born July 2, 1989) is a former American football center. He played college football for Southern Methodist University and was drafted by the Washington Redskins in third round of the 2012 NFL Draft. LeRibeus was also a member of the Philadelphia Eagles, New Orleans Saints, and Tampa Bay Buccaneers.

Professional career

Washington Redskins
LeRibeus was selected 71st overall in the 2012 NFL Draft by the Washington Redskins. While at SMU, he was a teammate of future Redskins teammates Richard Crawford, who the Redskins would later draft in the seventh round, and Aldrick Robinson, who was the Redskins' sixth round pick in 2011. After the Redskins' rookie mini-camp, head coach Mike Shanahan announced that LeRibeus will primarily be playing guard and will be a backup center, providing competition for Erik Cook. On July 18, 2012, he officially signed with the Redskins to a four-year contract. During training camp, he split snaps at the left guard position with Maurice Hurt after Kory Lichtensteiger had arthroscopic surgery on his right knee. He made his NFL debut against the Carolina Panthers in Week 9. Despite playing only five games, Redskins coaching staff believed LeRibeus had a chance to compete for a starting position in the next season.

During the 2013 offseason training camp, LeRibeus came 30 pounds overweight and out of shape. He was listed as inactive for the entire 2013 season.

On March 16, 2016, LeRibeus re-signed with the Redskins. He was released on September 3, 2016.

Philadelphia Eagles
On January 11, 2017, LeRibeus signed a reserve/future contract with the Eagles. On May 4, 2017, he was released by the Eagles.

New Orleans Saints
On May 15, 2017, LeRibeus signed with the New Orleans Saints.

On May 18, 2018, LeRibeus re-signed with the Saints. He played in six games, starting three at left guard in place of the injured Andrus Peat, before suffering an ankle injury in Week 7. He was placed on injured reserve on October 24, 2018.

Tampa Bay Buccaneers
On June 28, 2019, LeRibeus signed with the Tampa Bay Buccaneers. He was released during final roster cuts on August 30, 2019.

References

External links
 
 

Living people
1989 births
American football centers
American football offensive guards
New Orleans Saints players
People from Richardson, Texas
Philadelphia Eagles players
SMU Mustangs football players
Sportspeople from the Dallas–Fort Worth metroplex
Tampa Bay Buccaneers players
Washington Redskins players